The 2022 ICC Women's Cricket World Cup was the twelfth edition of the Women's Cricket World Cup, which was held in New Zealand in March and April 2022. It was originally scheduled for 6 February to 7 March 2021 but was postponed by one year due to the COVID-19 pandemic. On 15 December 2021, the International Cricket Council (ICC) announced that the tournament would start on 4 March 2022, with the final scheduled for 3 April 2022.

New Zealand qualified automatically as hosts, with all other qualification places determined by the ICC ODI Rankings. Originally, it was announced that three more teams would qualify from the 2017–2020 ICC Women's Championship, but in 2018 this was changed to four teams plus the hosts. It was intended that the remaining three places would be determined through the 2021 Women's Cricket World Cup Qualifier, which was postponed from 2020. However, the tournament was cancelled midway through and the remaining places allocated based on ODI rankings.

Australia were the first team to qualify for the semi-finals after they won their first five matches of the tournament. South Africa became the second team to reach the semi-finals, winning four out of their first six group matches, and gaining a point for a no result against the West Indies. The remaining two semi-final places were decided by the results of the final two matches in the group stage of the tournament. In the first match, England beat Bangladesh by 100 runs to secure their place in the knockout phase. In the last match of the group stage, South Africa beat India by three wickets. The result meant that India were eliminated, with the West Indies taking the final spot in the semi-finals.

Ahead of the first semi-final match, both teams were without key players in their squads. Australia's Ellyse Perry was ruled out of the match after suffering from back spasms, which had also forced her to miss Australia's last group match, against Bangladesh. For the West Indies, their leg spin bowler Afy Fletcher missed the match after testing positive for COVID-19. Australia won the match by 157 runs, with Alyssa Healy and Rachael Haynes scoring 216 runs for the first wicket, including a century from Healy. It was the seventh time that Australia had reached the final of the Women's Cricket World Cup. In the second semi-final, England beat South Africa by 137 runs, reaching their sixth World Cup final. Danni Wyatt scored a century and Sophie Ecclestone took a five-wicket haul to help the defending champions to reach the final.

In the final of the tournament, Australia beat England by 71 runs to win their seventh World Cup. Australia's Alyssa Healy scored 170 runs in the match, the highest individual score made by any cricketer, male or female, in the World Cup Final. England's Nat Sciver also scored a century in the final, finishing with 148 not out. Alyssa Healy was the leading run-scorer in the competition, with 509, and was named the Player of the Tournament. England's Sophie Ecclestone was the leading wicket-taker in the tournament, with 21 dismissals.

Qualification
On 27 November 2021, the ICC announced that the 2021 Women's Cricket World Cup Qualifier had been called off due to concerns of a new COVID variant and travel restrictions. Per the ICC's playing conditions, the three remaining qualification slots were based on the team's rankings, therefore Bangladesh, Pakistan and the West Indies progressed to the 2022 Women's Cricket World Cup.

Venues
On 11 March 2020, the ICC announced the six venues for the 2022 Women's World Cup. Eden Park hosted the final. Five other venues, which were used for the league stage and semifinals, were the Hagley Oval, Seddon Park, Bay Oval, University Oval and Basin Reserve.

Squads

Each team selected a squad of fifteen players for the World Cup, excluding reserves. On 6 January 2022, India became the first team to announce their squad. On 24 February 2022, the ICC updated its playing conditions for the tournament, allowing matches to go ahead if only nine players, in the event of a COVID-19 outbreak in a squad. Teams could use two female support staff substitutes, in non-batting and non-bowling roles, to play if needed.

Match officials
On 22 February 2022, the ICC appointed the officials for the tournament. Along with the twelve umpires, Gary Baxter, Shandre Fritz and G. S. Lakshmi were also named as the match referees. On 28 March 2022, the ICC confirmed the officials for the semi-final matches. On 1 April 2022, the ICC confirmed the officials for the final, with Lauren Agenbag and Kim Cotton named as the on-field umpires.

 Lauren Agenbag
 Kim Cotton
 Ahmed Shah Pakteen
 Ruchira Palliyaguruge
 Claire Polosak
 Sue Redfern
 Langton Rusere
 Sharfuddoula
 Eloise Sheridan
 Alex Wharf
 Jacqueline Williams
 Paul Wilson

Matches
A total of 31 matches including the semi-finals and a final were played, with all the matches being broadcast live. The opening match was originally planned to be played at the Bay Oval, Mount Maunganui, the two semi-finals at Seddon Park, Hamilton and Bay Oval, Mount Maunganui, with the final match played at Eden Park, Auckland. However on 15 December 2020, the ICC announced that the two semi-finals would be played at the Hagley Oval and the Basin Reserve.

Warm-up matches
Before the World Cup, the participating nations competed in eight warm-up matches, which were played from 27 February to 2 March 2022. These matches did not have either Women's One Day International (WODI) status or List A status.

Group stage
On 11 March 2020, it was announced that in the Group Stage, eight sides will participate in a single-league format with each side playing the other once. This format was last used in the 2017 tournament. The top four sides following the conclusion of the league matches progressed to the semi-finals with the winners meeting in the final. Therefore, a total of 31 matches were played during the tournament. In December 2020 the ICC announced the full match schedule for the tournament, with all the fixtures being confirmed in December 2021.

Round 1

Round 2

Round 3

Round 4

Round 5

Round 6

Round 7

Knockout Stage

Semi-finals

Final

Statistics

Most runs

Most wickets

References

External links
 Series home at ESPN Cricinfo

 
International cricket competitions in 2021–22
2022
2022 in women's cricket
International women's cricket competitions in New Zealand
Women's Cricket World Cup
2022 in New Zealand cricket
cricket
Cricket World Cup
Cricket World Cup